The Riot Act was an Act of Parliament passed in Great Britain in 1714.

Riot Act may also refer to:
 "Riot Act" (song), a 1980 song by Elvis Costello and the Attractions
 Riot Act (album), a 2002 album by Pearl Jam
 The Riot Act (film), a 2018 film
 "Riot Act", a song by Skid Row from the 1991 album Slave to the Grind
 Crackdown (video game), an Xbox 360 game released as Riot Act in Japan